Ji Yufeng (December 22, 1899 – May 18, 1982) was a Chinese chemist. He was a member of the Chinese Academy of Sciences.

References 

1899 births
1982 deaths
Members of the Chinese Academy of Sciences